Engeletin is a flavanonol rhamnoside, a phenolic compound found in wine and isolated from the bark of Hymenaea martiana.

See also 
 Phenolic compounds in wine

References 

Flavonoid rhamnosides